This military standard established the Standard Generalized Markup Language (SGML) and the Extensible
Markup Language (XML) requirements for use in Army digital publications. Within this military standard, Army
publications SGML/XML requirements are separated by publication types. There are specified sections
for administrative publications, training and doctrine publications, technical and equipment publications
and Global Combat Support System-Army (GCSS-A). This new publication of the standard contains the
XML requirements for Technical Manuals (TM) developed in accordance with the functional requirements
contained in MIL-STD-40051-1 and MIL-STD-40051-2, GCSS-A collection and reporting of maintenance data developed in
accordance with MIL-STD-3008, and administrative publications developed in accordance with AR 25–30.
The XML requirements are applicable for the development, acquisition, and delivery of Electronic and
Interactive Electronic Publications (EP/IEP) such as Electronic and Interactive Electronic Technical Manuals
(ETM/IETM). The previous SGML for training and doctrine publications functional requirements, developed
in accordance with TRADOC Reg 350-70 and TRADOC Reg 25–36, remain unchanged. Specific Interactive
Multimedia Instruction (IMI) functionality is currently contained in MIL-PRF-29612, The Development
and Acquisition of Training Data Products and TRADOC Reg 350–70, Systems Approach to Training
Management, Processes, and Products.

References 
 MIL-STD-2361
 MIL-HDBK-2361
 AR 25-30
 MIL-STD-40051-1
 MIL-STD-40051-2
 MIL-STD-3008
 TRADOC Reg 350-70
 MIL-PRF-29612
 TRADOC Reg 25-36
 Army SGML/XML Registry and Library - Guidance and References

Military of the United States standards